"Tso če dā źməka asmān wī" was the national anthem of the Republic of Afghanistan from 1973 to 1978. In 1973, the Kingdom of Afghanistan was overthrown and the Republic was established, so the country began to formulate a new national anthem, because the second national anthem: Our Brave and Noble King was a pure tribute to the king Mohammed Zahir Shah. In 1978, the Afghan military launched Saur Revolution to overthrow the Republic, and the national anthem was abolished five years after its opening.

Lyrics

Pashto original

English translation
So long as there is Earth and Heaven;
So long as the world endures;
So long as there is life in the world;
So long as a single Afghan breathes;
There will be this Afghanistan.
Long live the Afghan nation.
Long live the Republic.
Forever there be our national unity;
Forever there be the Afghan nation and Republic;
𝄆 Forever the Afghan nation and Republic. 𝄇
𝄆 O National Unity! 𝄇

See also

List of historical national anthems
Afghan National Anthem

References

External links

Afghan songs
Asian anthems
Historical national anthems
National symbols of Afghanistan
National anthem compositions in F minor
Pashto-language songs